Happy New Year, Colin Burstead is a 2018 British comedy-drama film written and directed by Ben Wheatley and featuring Neil Maskell as the title character, with Hayley Squires, Sam Riley, Doon Mackichan, Joe Cole, and Charles Dance also starring. It tells the story of a man who rents a country house for his extended family to celebrate the New Year. The film premiered at the 62nd BFI London Film Festival on 11 October 2018, and was distributed by BBC Films, airing on BBC Two on 30 December 2018.

Plot 
Colin (Neil Maskell) rents a country house in Dorset for his extended family to celebrate the New Year. Unbeknownst to other members of the family, his sister Gini (Hayley Squires) has invited their estranged brother David (Sam Riley).

Cast 

 Sarah Baxendale as Paula
 Sudha Bhuchar as Maya
 Asim Chaudhry as Sham
 Joe Cole as Ed
 Charles Dance as Bertie
 Sura Dohnke as Val
 Vincent Ebrahim as Nikhil
 Peter Ferdinando as Jimmy
 Richard Glover as Lord Richard
 Alexandra Maria Lara as Hannah
 Doon Mackichan as Sandy
 Neil Maskell as Colin
 Sinead Matthews as Lainey
 Mark Monero as Warren
 Nicole Nettleingham as Fran
 Bill Paterson as Gordon
 Sam Riley as David
 Hayley Squires as Gini

Production 
The film is loosely based on Shakespeare's Coriolanus. After seeing Tom Hiddleston playing Coriolanus while casting High-Rise (2015), Ben Wheatley wrote the script. He reduced the plot to its bare bones and rebuilt it in a modern context. The film's working title was Colin You Anus. The film was shot in two weeks at the beginning of 2018. The filming took place at Pennsylvania Castle in Dorset. Clint Mansell wrote the score for the film.

Release 
On 11 October 2018, the film was screened at the 62nd BFI London Film Festival in competition. It aired on BBC2 on 30 December 2018. The film was also screened at the 2019 Palm Springs International Film Festival.

Reception 

Peter Bradshaw of The Guardian gave the film 3 stars out of 5, saying, "the performances are all great; they collectively create a directionless storm-cloud of disquiet." Stephen Dalton of The Hollywood Reporter wrote: "Featuring a large ensemble cast of mostly British faces, this dysfunctional family drama is a departure in tone but not in style, returning Wheatley to his lo-fi social-realist roots." Guy Lodge of Variety called it "one of his best, most fluid films." Ella Kemp of Sight & Sound wrote: "The film takes a while to warm up, but unforgiving writing gives it a deadpan backbone of brilliance."

Ben Wheatley was nominated for the Best Editing award at the British Independent Film Awards 2018.

References

External links 
 
 

2018 films
British comedy-drama films
2018 comedy-drama films
Films directed by Ben Wheatley
Films scored by Clint Mansell
Films set in country houses
2010s English-language films
2010s British films